VAW may refer to:
 Violence against women
 Vardø Airport, Svartnes, airport IATA code
 VAW-### is the United States Navy designation for a Fixed Wing Airborne Early Warning Squadron